The Hopman Cup XXVII was the 27th edition of the Hopman Cup tournament between nations in men's and women's tennis. The tournament commenced on 4 January 2015 at the Perth Arena in Perth, Western Australia.

Eight teams competed for the title, with two round robin groups of four, from which the top team of each group advanced to the Final.

France were the 2014 champions. In that tournament's final the French team of Alizé Cornet and Jo-Wilfried Tsonga defeated Poland 2–1, but they failed to defend their title. Agnieszka Radwańska recorded an impressive win over Serena Williams in the final, ultimately carrying the Polish team to their first Hopman Cup title with a 2–1 victory over the United States.

Entrants

Seeds
On 1 October, the full line-up for the event was announced.

Replacement players

Group stage

Group A
All times are local (UTC+8).

Standings

Canada vs. Czech Republic

Italy vs. United States

Czech Republic vs. Italy

 Fabio Fognini was unable to participate in the mixed doubles rubber, Czech was awarded a 6–0, 6–0 win. However, a match was still played in which the score was 8–6 to Czech republic (see above).

Canada vs. USA

Canada vs. Italy

Czech Republic vs. USA

Group B
All times are local (UTC+8).

Standings

Australia vs. Poland

 Matthew Ebden was unable to participate in the mixed doubles rubber, Poland was awarded a 6–0, 6–0 win. However a match was still played in which the score was 8–6 to Poland (see above).

Great Britain vs. France

Great Britain vs. Poland

Australia vs. France

France vs. Poland

Since Poland had already won the group and clinched a berth in the Final with their win in the men's singles match, the mixed doubles rubber comprised just a single tiebreak set by agreement between the teams (see above). Poland retired after first set.

Australia vs. Great Britain

Final

United States vs. Poland

References

External links
 Official Site

Hopman Cup
Hopman Cups by year
2015 in Australian tennis
Hopman Cup